The 2013 Cleveland Browns season was the franchise's 65th season as a professional sports franchise and its 61st season as a member of the National Football League. They failed to improve on their 5–11 record from 2012, finishing the year at 4–12 their sixth consecutive 11+ loss season. They also extended their franchise record playoff drought to 11 years. This was the first season under head coach Rob Chudzinski (who was later fired after the season) and new general manager Michael Lombardi (who was later fired in February 2014). This also marked the first full season under owner Jimmy Haslam. The Browns played all of their home games at the newly renamed FirstEnergy Stadium (formerly known as Cleveland Browns Stadium).

Offseason

Personnel changes

Front office changes 
On December 31, 2012, the Browns fired general manager Tom Heckert.

Coaching staff changes 
On December 31, 2012, the team fired head coach Pat Shurmur.  In two seasons as Browns' head coach, Shurmur posted a record of 9–23, including a disappointing 2–10 mark within the division.

University of Oregon head coach Chip Kelly emerged as the favorite to replace Shurmur after a lengthy interview on January 4, however talks between the two sides broke down and Kelly decided to go to the Philadelphia Eagles.

On January 10, the Browns hired former Carolina Panthers' offensive coordinator Rob Chudzinski as head coach.  Chudzinski, who spent the 2011 and 2012 seasons with the Panthers, also previously served as an assistant coach with the Browns and the San Diego Chargers.

Besides Chudzinski and Kelly, the Browns also interviewed former Arizona Cardinals' head coach Ken Whisenhunt and defensive coordinator Ray Horton, Syracuse University head coach Doug Marrone, Penn State head coach Bill O'Brien, Montreal Alouettes head coach and former Browns' assistant coach Marc Trestman, and Cincinnati Bengals' defensive coordinator Mike Zimmer.

On January 17, the Browns hired former San Diego Chargers' head coach Norv Turner as offensive coordinator.  Turner, who served as Chargers' head coach from 2007 to 2012, was also the head coach of the Washington Redskins (1994–2000) and Oakland Raiders (2004–2005), and has served as an NFL coach in some capacity since 1985. Turner replaces Brad Childress.

On January 17, the Browns also added Mike Sullivan as offensive line coach, Scott Turner, the son of Norv Turner, as wide receivers coach, and Brad Roll as strength and conditioning coach.

On January 18, the Browns hired Horton, who previously interviewed for the head coaching position, as defensive coordinator.   Horton, a former defensive back, has served as the Cardinals' defensive coordinator the past two seasons.

Roster changes

Free agency

Releases

Signings

Trades 
 On April 1, the Browns traded QB Colt McCoy and a 2013 sixth-round draft pick to the San Francisco 49ers for a fifth- and a seventh-round draft pick in 2013.
 On April 11, the Browns traded LB Emmanuel Acho to the Philadelphia Eagles for RB Dion Lewis.
 On April 26, the Browns traded a 2013 fourth- and fifth-round draft pick to the Miami Dolphins for WR Davone Bess and a fourth- and seventh-round draft pick in 2013.
 On September 18, the Browns traded RB Trent Richardson to the Indianapolis Colts for a first-round pick in 2014.

2013 draft class

Notes
 The team forfeited its second-round selection (which would have been No. 39) after selecting wide receiver Josh Gordon in the 2012 Supplemental Draft.
 The team acquired a 6th-round selection (No. 173) in a trade that sent safety David Sims and a 7th-round selection to the Philadelphia Eagles.
 The team acquired a 5th (No. 164) and 7th-round selection (No. 227) in a trade that sent quarterback Colt McCoy and a 6th-round selection (No. 173) to the San Francisco 49ers.
 The team acquired WR Davone Bess and a 4th (No. 111) and 7th (No. 217) round selection for a fourth (No. 104) and 5th (No. 164) round selection.
 The team traded its fourth-round selection  (No. 111) to the Pittsburgh Steelers for a 2014 third-round selection.
 The team traded its fifth-round selection  (No. 139) to the Indianapolis Colts for a 2014 fourth-round selection.

Preseason

Schedule

Regular season

Schedule

Note: Intra-division opponents are in bold text.

Game summaries

Week 1: vs. Miami Dolphins

The Browns opened their 2013 season at home against the Dolphins.  The Dolphins struck first in the first quarter when Caleb Sturgis kicked a 45-yard field goal for a 3–0 lead.  They increased their lead in the 2nd quarter when Sturgis nailed a 49-yard field goal for a 6–0 lead.  The Browns got on the board and took the halftime lead 7–6 after Jordan Cameron caught a 7-yard TD pass from Brandon Weeden.  The Dolphins retook the lead in the 3rd quarter when Brian Hartline caught a 34-yard TD pass from Ryan Tannehill to make the score 13–7.  The Browns came within 3 as Billy Cundiff kicked a 39-yard field goal for a 13–10 game.  In the 4th quarter, the Phins sealed the game as Daniel Thomas ran for a 1-yard TD for a 20–10 game followed up by Sturgis kicking a 36-yard field goal.

With the loss, the Browns start the season 0–1 and pick up their 9th straight regular season opening loss.

Week 2: at Baltimore Ravens

After a tough loss at home, the Browns traveled to Baltimore to take on the Ravens.  The Browns scored all the points in the first half; both of them with field goals in both quarters from Billy Cundiff from 21 yards out in the first quarter and 51 yards out in the 2nd making the score 3–0 and eventual halftime score 6–0.  The Ravens got on the board in the 3rd quarter as Bernard Pierce ran for a 5-yard TD to take the lead 7–6.  In the 4th quarter, the Ravens moved ahead by 8 as Joe Flacco found Marion Brown on a 5-yard TD pass for a final score of 14–6.

With the loss, the Browns dropped to 0–2.  The team also lost their 11th straight game against the Ravens.

Week 3: at Minnesota Vikings

After a tough road loss, the Browns traveled northwest to take on the Vikings.  The Vikes would score first as AP ran for a 2-yard TD for a 7–0 lead.  The Browns managed to tie it as 2nd-string QB Brian Hoyer found Josh Gordon on a 47-yard TD pass for a 7–7 game.  The Browns took the lead in the 2nd quarter as Hoyer found Jordan Cameron for a 19-yard TD pass and a 14–7 lead.  The Vikes tied the game as Christian Ponder ran for a 6-yard TD to make the score 14–14.  The Browns moved back into the lead as Billy Cundiff kicked a 38-yard field goal for a 17–14 lead and increased it with a trick play as Spencer Lanning found Cameron on an 11-yard TD pass for increasing the score to 24–14.  Blair Walsh managed to get the Vikes within 7 after he kicked a 43-yard field goal for a 24–17 halftime lead.
After the break, Ponder ran for another TD from 8 yards out tying the game 24–24. They retook the lead in the 4th quarter as Walsh nailed a 30-yard field goal for a 27–24 lead.  Hoyer found Cameron with less than a minute left in the game for a final score of 31–27.

With the win, not only did the Browns improve to 1–2, but they also snapped a 7-game losing streak against NFC teams.

Week 4: vs. Cincinnati Bengals

After a tough win over the Vikings, the Browns returned home for a game against the Bengals in Round 1 of the Battle of Ohio.  In the first quarter, the Browns scored first as Brian Hoyer found Jordan Cameron on a 2-yard pass for a 7–0 lead.  In the second quarter, the Bengals scored when Mike Nugent nailed a 25-yard field goal for the eventual halftime score of 7–3.  In the third quarter, the Browns scored a field goal of their own when Billy Cundiff nailed one from 51 yards out giving them a 10–3 lead.  The Bengals once again came within 4 as Nugent kicked another field goal from 46 yards out for a 10–6 game.  In the fourth quarter, it was all Browns as Hoyer found Chris Ogbonnaya on a 1-yard pass for the eventual final score of 17–6.

With the win, the Browns improved to 2–2.

Week 5: vs. Buffalo Bills

After a win over the Bengals, the Browns stayed home for a Thursday Night duel against the Bills.  The Bills scored first when Fred Jackson ran for a 1-yard touchdown for a 7–0 lead followed up by Dan Carpenter nailing a 52-yard field goal increasing their lead to 10–0.  In the second quarter, it was all Browns as Billy Cundiff kicked a 33-yard field goal for a 10–3 game.  They eventually tied the game up and moved into the lead when Willis McGahee ran for a 1-yard touchdown for a 10–10 game followed up by Travis Benjamein returning a punt 79 yards for a touchdown for a halftime score of 17–10.  In the third quarter, the Bills tied it up and took the lead back when C.J. Spiller ran for a 54-yard touchdown for a 17–17 game followed up by McGahee running for another 1-yard touchdown for a 24–17 lead.  The Browns however later on in the quarter, tied it back up as Brandon Weeden hooked up with Josh Gordon for a 37-yard pass for a 24–24 game.  In the fourth quarter, it was all Browns as Cundiff made field goals from 24 and 44 yards out for leads of 27–24 and 30–24 before sealing the game when T.J. Ward returned an interception 44 yards for a touchdown and for the final score of 37–24.

With their 3rd straight win, the Browns improved to 3–2.

Week 6: vs. Detroit Lions

After a big win over the Bills, the Browns would remain at home for the third week in a row this time taking on the Lions.  The Lions scored first in the first quarter when Joseph Fauria caught a 1-yard pass from Matthew Stafford for a 7–0 lead.  In the second quarter, it was all Browns when Brandon Weeden found Chris Ogbonnaya on a 4-yard pass tying the game up 7–7 and taking the lead when Weeden found Greg Little on a 2-yard pass for a 14–7 lead.  This was followed up by Billy Cundiff nailing a 40-yard field goal as the Browns lead 17–7 at halftime.  In the second half however, it was all Lions starting in the third quarter when Stafford found Reggie Bush on an 18-yard pass to come within 3, 17–14.  In the fourth quarter, they took the lead back when Stafford found Fauria on a 23-yard pass for a 21–17 lead followed up by David Akers nailing a 51-yard field goal for a 24–17 lead and finally Stafford and Fauria hooking up again on a 10-yard pass for the final score of 31–17.

With their 3-game winning streak snapped, the Browns fell to 3–3.

Week 7: at Green Bay Packers

After a tough loss at home, the Browns traveled to take on the Packers.  In the first quarter, it was all Packers as Aaron Rodgers found Jermichael Finley on a 10-yard pass taking a 7–0 lead followed up by Eddie Lacy running for a 1-yard touchdown for a 14–0 lead.  In the second quarter, the Browns got on the board as Billy Cundiff kicked a 46-yard field goal 14–3 game.  Though the Packers moved ahead by 2 touchdowns at halftime when Mason Crosby nailed a 26-yard field goal for a 17–3 game.  In the third quarter, the Browns would score the only points when Cundiff kicked another field goal this time from 44 yards out for a 17–6 game.  In the fourth quarter, the Packers went back to work as Rodgers found Jordy Nelson on a 1-yard pass for a 24–6 game.  The Browns came within 11 again as Brandon Weeden found Jordan Cameron on a 2-yard pass for a 24–13 game.  The Packers would later on seal the game when Rodgers found Jarrett Boykin on a 20-yard pass for the eventual final score 31–13.

With the loss, the Browns dropped to 3–4.

Week 8: at Kansas City Chiefs

After a tough loss on the road, the Browns traveled again to take on the Chiefs.  In the first quarter, it was all Chiefs as Ryan Succop nailed 2 field goals from 42 and 35 yards out for leads of 3–0 and 6–0.  In the second quarter, Alex Smith found Anthony Sherman on a 12-yard pass for a 13–0 game.  The Browns finally got on the board when Jason Campbell found Josh Gordon on a 39-yard pass for a 13–7 game.  Though the Chiefs pulled away as Smith found Dexter McCluster on a 28-yard pass for a 20–7 lead.  The Browns wrapped things up with Billy Cundiff's 44-yard field goal giving the Chiefs a 20–10 lead at halftime.  In the third quarter the Browns came within 3 when Campbell found Fozzy Whittaker on a 17-yard pass for a 20–17 game for the only score of the period.  In the fourth quarter, the Chiefs wrapped the scoring up when Succop nailed a 40-yard field goal for the eventual final score of 23–17.

With the loss and 3-game losing streak, the Browns dropped to 3–5.

Week 9: vs. Baltimore Ravens

After a tough loss on the road, the Browns returned home to take on the Ravens.  They would score first in the first quarter when Jason Campbell found Davone Bess on a 1-yard pass for a 7–0 lead.  The Ravens would shorten the lead when Justin Tucker nailed a 51-yard field goal to make it 7–3.  In the second quarter, the Browns moved ahead by double digits when Campbell found Bess again this time on a 20-yard pass for a 14–3 lead.  The Ravens came within 4 again when Joe Flacco found Marlon Brown on a 19-yard pass for a 14–10 game at halftime.  In the third quarter, the Browns moved ahead by double digits again when Campbell found Gary Barnidge on a 4-yard pass to lead 21–10 for the quarter's only score.  In the fourth quarter, the Ravens drew closer as Flacco found Brown again on a 7-yard pass for a 21–18 game.  Though later on, the Browns wrapped up the scoring when Billy Cundiff kicked a 22-yard field goal for a 24–18 final score.

With the win and 3-game losing streak snapped, the Browns went into their bye week 4–5.  They would also defeat the Ravens for the first time since 2007 and also snapped their 11-game losing streak against them.

Week 11: at Cincinnati Bengals

The Browns came back from their bye week and traveled to Cincinnati to take on the Bengals in the year's Battle of Ohio Round 2.  The Browns put up 13 points in the first quarter before the Bengals put up 31 in the second quarter and led 31–13 at halftime.  They tried to rally in the third quarter coming within 11, 31–20.  But 10 points in the fourth quarter would assure the game for the Bengals as they would win 41–20.

With the loss, the Browns fell to 4–6.

Week 12: vs. Pittsburgh Steelers

Week 13: vs. Jacksonville Jaguars

Week 14: at New England Patriots

Cleveland squandered a 26–14 lead that they had at the two-minute warning in the fourth quarter as Tom Brady and the Patriots scored two unanswered touchdowns followed by a missed game-winning field goal by Cundiff. The Browns dropped to 4–9, clinching their sixth consecutive losing season.

Week 15: vs. Chicago Bears

With the loss, the Browns fell to 4–10 (a 3–5 home record) and were eliminated from postseason contention for the eleventh straight season, extending their franchise record for most consecutive seasons without a playoff berth.

Week 16: at New York Jets

Week 17: at Pittsburgh Steelers

Standings

Division

Conference

Staff

Final roster

References

External links
   
 2013 Cleveland Browns at Pro Football Reference (Profootballreference.com)
 2013 Cleveland Browns Statistics at jt-sw.com
 2013 Cleveland Browns Schedule at jt-sw.com
 2013 Cleveland Browns at DatabaseFootball.com  

Cleveland
Cleveland Browns seasons
Cleveland